Mt. Moriah Baptist Church is a historic church at 314 N. Main Street in Middlesboro, Kentucky. It was built during 1918-21 and added to the National Register of Historic Places in 1985.

It is a brick building with brick laid in common bond.

It was deemed significant as "The church building has played an important role in the history of the black community of Middlesboro and is a visible expression of the important role blacks have played in the settlement and later development of planned communities such as
Middlesboro," which is the largest planned community in southeastern Kentucky.

References

Baptist churches in Kentucky
Churches on the National Register of Historic Places in Kentucky
African-American history of Kentucky
National Register of Historic Places in Bell County, Kentucky
1921 establishments in Kentucky
Gothic Revival church buildings in Kentucky
Middlesboro, Kentucky